
Gmina Kosów Lacki is an urban-rural gmina (administrative district) in Sokołów County, Masovian Voivodeship, in east-central Poland.

Villages
Apart from the town of Kosów Lacki, Gmina Kosów Lacki contains the villages and settlements of Albinów, Bojary, Buczyn Dworski, Buczyn Szlachecki, Chruszczewka Szlachecka, Chruszczewka Włościańska, Dębe, Dybów, Grzymały, Guty, Henrysin, Jakubiki, Kosów Ruski, Kosów-Hulidów, Krupy, Kutyski, Łomna, Nowa Maliszewa, Nowa Wieś Kosowska, Nowy Buczyn, Rytele Święckie, Sągole, Stara Maliszewa, Telaki, Tosie, Trzciniec Duży, Trzciniec Mały, Wólka Dolna, Wólka Okrąglik, Wyszomierz and Żochy.

Neighbouring gminas
Gmina Kosów Lacki is bordered by the gminas of Ceranów, Małkinia Górna, Miedzna, Sabnie, Sadowne, Sokołów Podlaski, Sterdyń and Stoczek.

References

Polish official population figures 2006

Kosow Lacki
Sokołów County